The Victoria's Secret Fashion Show is an annual fashion show sponsored by Victoria's Secret, a brand of lingerie and sleepwear. Victoria's Secret uses the show to promote and market its goods in high-profile settings. The show features some of the world's leading fashion models, such as current Victoria's Secret Angels Adriana Lima, Alessandra Ambrosio, Candice Swanepoel, Doutzen Kroes, Miranda Kerr, Erin Heatherton, Behati Prinsloo, Lindsay Ellingson, Lily Aldridge, and Chanel Iman. Lais Ribeiro also received billing.

The 16th fashion show featured some the new Angels (Karlie Kloss being the only newcomer to walk three times since 2006) and also the returning Angels. There were special performances by Kanye West, Maroon 5, Jay-Z, and Nicki Minaj.

Fashion show segments

Segment 1: Ballet

Segment 2: Super Angels

Special Performance

Segment 3: Passion

Segment 4: Aquatic Angels

Segment 5: I Put a Spell On You

Segment 6: Club Pink

Finale

Alessandra Ambrosio and Adriana Lima led the finale.

Index

External links 
 VSFS 2011 Gallery
 The Victoria's Secret Fashion Show 2011 on YouTube

Victoria's Secret
2011 in fashion